Vasudev may refer to
 Vasudeva, father of Krishna in Indian epics
 Vasudev (name)
Vakkeel Vasudev, a 1993 Indian Malayalam film